The football tournament at the 2004 Summer Olympics started on 11 August (two days before the opening ceremony), and ended on 28 August.

The tournaments take place every four years, in conjunction with the Summer Olympic Games. The associations affiliated to FIFA are invited to participate with their men's U-23 and women's representative teams. The men's tournament allows up to three overage players to join the U-23 squads.

The men's tournament was won by Argentina, coached by Marcelo Bielsa, which held a record of having won every match without conceding a goal in the tournament. The Golden Boot was won by Argentina's Carlos Tevez.  The women's tournament was won by the United States.

Venues
Olympic Stadium, Athens
Karaiskakis Stadium, Piraeus
Pankritio Stadium, Heraklion
Pampeloponnisiako Stadium, Patras
Kaftanzoglio Stadium, Thessaloniki
Panthessaliko Stadium, Volos

Men

Women

FIFA Fair play award

Women's tournament
Japan
Sweden

References

External links

Olympic Football Tournaments Athens 2004 – Men, FIFA.com
Olympic Football Tournaments Athens 2004 – Women, FIFA.com
Official result book – Football

 
2004
2004 in association football
2004